= World Cup Germany =

Germany has hosted the FIFA World Cup twice. Hence World Cup Germany may refer to:

- the 1974 FIFA World Cup of West Germany
- the 2006 FIFA World Cup of Germany, as a unified nation
